Wrestling at the 2018 Asian Games was held at the Jakarta Convention Center Assembly Hall, Jakarta, Indonesia from 19 to 22 August 2018.

Schedule

Medalists

Men's freestyle

Men's Greco-Roman

Women's freestyle

Medal table

Participating nations 
A total of 249 athletes from 29 nations competed in wrestling at the 2018 Asian Games:

References

External links
Wrestling at the 2018 Asian Games
UWW Results Book
Official Result Book – Wrestling

 
2018
Asian Games
2018 Asian Games events
2018 Asian Games